Richard Michael Heiserman (born February 22, 1973) is a former Major League Baseball pitcher. Heiserman came to the Cardinals after he was traded by the Cleveland Indians along with David Bell and Pepe McNeal in exchange for Ken Hill.

References

External links

1973 births
Living people
Baseball players from Iowa
St. Louis Cardinals players
Major League Baseball pitchers
Long Island Ducks players
People from Atlantic, Iowa